The list of shipwrecks in March 1829 includes some ships sunk, wrecked or otherwise lost during March 1829.

1 March

3 March

5 March

6 March

7 March

10 March

14 March

17 March

19 March

22 March

23 March

24 March

26 March

31 March

Unknown date

References

1829-03